Danielle Ferland (born January 31, 1971) is an American actress and singer, best known for originating the role of Little Red Ridinghood in Stephen Sondheim's Into the Woods on Broadway.

Career
Ferland attended Frank Scott Bunnell High School in Stratford, Connecticut, from 1983–1987 and attended New York University.

She made her Broadway debut at age 13 as Louise in Stephen Sondheim's Sunday in the Park with George (1984). She next appeared off-Broadway in Paradise! (1985). In 1987 she was the singing child star in Woody Allen's Radio Days. 

She returned to Broadway, originating the role of Little Red Riding Hood in the 1987 musical Into the Woods. For her performance in Into the Woods she received the 1988 Theatre World Award and also was nominated for the 1988 Drama Desk Award, Outstanding Featured Actress in a Musical. She reunited with the original cast for three performances in 1989, which were filmed for the Season 10 premiere episode of PBS’s American Playhouse.

Other credits include The Crucible (1991), Fredrika in A Little Night Music Lincoln Center Revival in 1991, Uncommon Women and Others (1994), Tartuffe at the Delacorte Theatre in 1999, A Year with Frog and Toad (2003), Engaged (2004), She Stoops to Conquer at the Irish Repertory Company in 2005, the concert and recording of the York Theatre production of Summer of '42 (2006), Like Love, New York Music Festival, 2007 and All My Sons (2008).

She teaches Master Classes including in 2009 at the Boston Children's Theatre.

Ferland narrated an audio book version of ''A Mile In My Flip-Flops'' written by Melody Carlson.

In 2011 she directed A Year with Frog and Toad with Boston Children's Theatre.

In 2012 Ferland starred in the Baltimore CenterStage and Westport Country Playhouse production of Into the Woods as the Baker's Wife.

In 2014 Ferland played the role of Estelle in HBO's drama The Normal Heart.

In 2015 Ferland appeared in Season 1 of the Netflix show Marvel's Jessica Jones.

Personal life
Ferland was born in Derby, Connecticut. She married Michael Goldstein ca. 2002; they have two sons.

Stage credits

Theatre credits

Awards and nominations

References

External links

Internet Off-Broadway Database listing

1971 births
Living people
New York University alumni
American stage actresses
American film actresses
American television actresses
People from Derby, Connecticut
Actresses from Connecticut
21st-century American women